Osbeckia stellata is a flowering plant in the family Melastomataceae.

It is native to mountainous areas of China, Bhutan, Burma, Cambodia, Laos, Northeast India, Nepal, Thailand and Vietnam. It is usually found on grassy mountain slopes at high altitudes.

References

External links

stellata
Flora of China
Flora of the Indian subcontinent
Flora of Indo-China